Lola is a 1974 Spanish drama film directed by José María Forqué and starring David Hemmings, Alida Valli and Francisco Rabal. A dissolute young hacienda-owner makes many enemies through his behaviour. Its Spanish title is No es nada, mamá, sólo un juego.

Cast
 David Hemmings - Juan
 Alida Valli - Louise
 Francisco Rabal - Tío
 Andrea Rau - Lola
 Nuria Gimeno - Lucia
 Galeazzo Benti - Doctor
 Aquiles Guerrero - Aquiles
 Lucila Herrera - Maria
 Gonzalo Fernández de Córdoba hijo - Juan as child
 Rudy Hernández - Isabel
 Enrique Soto - Lolas Father

References

External links

1974 films
Spanish drama films
1974 drama films
English-language Spanish films
1970s Spanish-language films
Films directed by José María Forqué
1970s English-language films
1970s Spanish films